A transition metal phosphido complex is a coordination complex containing a phosphido ligand (R2P, where R = H, organic substituent).  With two lone pairs on phosphorus, the phosphido anion (R2P−) is comparable to an amido anion (R2N−), except that the M-P distances are longer and the phosphorus atom is more sterically accessible.  For these reasons, phosphido is often a bridging ligand. The -PH2 ion or ligand is also called phosphanide or phosphido ligand.

Synthesis 
Phosphido ligands are often installed by salt metathesis reactions. Sources of R2P+ and R2P− are provided by phosphorus halides and alkali metal phosphides respectively.  Illustrative of the use of R2PCl-like reagents is the synthesis of a diiron diphosphide:
Na2Fe2(CO)8  +  2 Ph2PCl   →   Fe2(PPh2)2(CO)6  +  2 NaCl  +  2 CO
The alternative salt metathesis route involves the reaction of alkali metal diorganophosphides with metal halides.  A typical phosphide reagent is lithium diphenylphosphide. 

Alkali metal phosphides sometimes reduce the metal center.

Another way to generate the transition-metal phosphido complexes are by direct activation of P-H bonds and is mostly seen in the late-transition-metal complexes. For example, the reaction of Vaska's complex analogs with the parent phosphine generate the following transition-metal phosphido complex.

Structure

Complexes of the phosphide ligand can be classified into one of three classes: 
those where the phosphide is a terminal ligand and phosphorus is pyramidal,
those where the phosphide is a terminal ligand and phosphorus is planar,
those where the phosphide is a bridging ligand and phosphorus is tetrahedral.

Terminal phosphido ligands
In most complexes with terminal phosphido ligands, phosphorus is pyramidal, as expected with a stereochemically active lone pair of electrons. The M-P bond length in the pyramidal phosphide complex is longer than the M-P bond length in corresponding transition metal phosphine complexes.  The pyramidal phosphido complex. In the complex, the Os-PHPh bond is 0.11 Å longer than the Os-PPh3 and the Os-P-C angle is 113o.  The elongated  Os-PHPh bond is often attributed to the electronic repulsion of the lone pair and nonbonding electrons on Os. Also, in another ruthenium complex, the Ru-P(Me)Ph bond is 0.17 Å longer than Ru-PH(Me)Ph in the related phosphine ligand version of the complex, [(dmpe)2Ru(H)PH(Me)Ph]+. Additionally electronic repulsion of the P-centered lone pair and metal-based electrons enhance the nucleophilicity of the phosphide ligand. This high basicity and high nucleophilicity leads to the dimerization reaction. 

As implied in the resonance structures A and B, some terminal phosphido ligands engage in M-P multiple bonding. In the resonance structure A, the lone pair from the p-orbital on phosphorus donates to the vacant orbital on the metal to form a π-bond. Because of the π-bonding interaction in resonance structure A, it is planar at phosphorus and M-P bond-length is shorter and M-P-R bond-angle is larger. Planar phosphido complexes usually have shorter M-P bonds and larger M-P-R angles. In the tungsten complex, the W-PHPh bond is 0.26 Å shorter than W-PEt3 bond in the same complex, and the W-P-C angle is 140°. Another example is a ruthenium complex. In those complex, the Ru-PCy2 bond is 0.11 Å shorter than Ru-PPh3 bond and the Ru-P-C angle is 127°.

While the planar and pyramidal phosphides can be distinguished clearly, in one case, a pyramidal phosphide can be converted to planar phosphide by one-electron oxidation.

The inversion of configuration at pyramidal terminal phosphides has been observed by 31P NMR spectroscopy.

Bridging phosphido ligands

In most of its complexes, the phosphido ligand is a bridging ligand. No lone pairs remain on phosphorus.  These complexes have the formula [M(μ-PR2)Ln]2. One example is [Fe(μ-PPh2)(CO)3]2.

Applications 
Metal phosphido complexes are however intermediates the catalytic hydrophosphinations. 

Some late metal hydrophosphination catalysts rely on oxidative addition of a P-H bond. For example, a Pt(0) catalyst that undergoes oxidative addition of a secondary phosphine to form the corresponding Pt(II) phosphido complex, which react with electrophilic alkenes such as acrylonitrile. This P-C bond forming step proceeds through an outer-sphere, Michael-type addition. cAlkene insertion into the metal-hydrogen bond is also invoked in some hydrophosphinations.

Metal phosphide have been used in the synthesis of P-stereogenic phosphines by exploiting the high nucleophilicity in the pyramidal phosphide complex.

References 

Phosphides